Martti Pesonen is a Finnish former professional motorcycle road racer. He competed in Grand Prix motorcycle racing from 1969 to 1971.

Pesonen had his most successful year in 1970 when he finished in fifth place in the 350cc World Championship. He was a childhood friend of motocross world champion, Heikki Mikkola.

References 

Year of birth missing (living people)
Living people
Finnish motorcycle racers
250cc World Championship riders
350cc World Championship riders
500cc World Championship riders